The 1934–35 Duke Blue Devils men's basketball team represented Duke University during the 1934–35 men's college basketball season. The head coach was Eddie Cameron, coaching his seventh season with the Blue Devils. The team finished with an overall record of 18–8.

References 

Duke Blue Devils men's basketball seasons
Duke
1934 in sports in North Carolina
1935 in sports in North Carolina